The bee subfamily Alocandreninae contains only one genus and one species, Alocandrena porteri, which is found in Peru. It seems to be restricted to the western side of the Andes Mountains.

It has been recorded throughout the year, suggesting multiple generations per year. Females collect pollen from Lycopersicon species.

References 

Andrenidae
Monotypic bee genera